The Chiricahua Mountains massif is a large mountain range in southeastern Arizona which is part of the Basin and Range province of the west and southwestern United States and northwest Mexico; the range is part of the Coronado National Forest. The range takes its name from the Chiricahua Apaches native to the region.

The Chiricahua Mountains and other associated ranges, along with Sulphur Springs Valley on the west and the San Simon Valley on the east, form the eastern half of Cochise County in southeast Arizona. The Pedregosa Mountains are found at the southern end of the Chiricahua Mountains, while the Swisshelm Mountains are located to the southwest.  The northwest end of the Chiricahua mountains continue as the Dos Cabezas Mountains beyond Apache Pass and the Fort Bowie National Historic Site. Access to the Chiricahua Mountains and Coronado National Forest is through Willcox from the north, Douglas from the south, and Rodeo from the east.

Part of the range lies within the  Chiricahua Wilderness, managed by the Coronado National Forest.

History
The earliest evidence of humans in the vicinity of the Chiricahua Mountains are Clovis archeological sites such as Double Adobe Site in the Whitewater Draw tributary of Rucker Creek north of Douglas. Subsequently, the Cochise culture another pre-ceramic based culture spanning 3000–200 BCE was defined from sites around the Chiricahua Mountains, including Cave Creek Canyon.

Following the transition to ceramics, artifacts characteristic of both Mogollon culture and its local variants, the Mimbres culture, are found. These relics span the period from 150 BCE – 1450. The influx of other indigenous peoples, such as the Chiricahua Apaches, including the leaders Cochise and Geronimo occupied the area until forced removal in the late 19th century.

The name Chiricahua is believed to originate from the Opata name for the mountains, Chiwi Kawi, meaning "Turkey Mountain". The Chiricahuas were once known for an abundance of wild turkeys.

The first recorded mining claim in the Chiricahua Mountains was the Hidden Treasure claim filed in 1881, and mining has continued intermittently to the present with the greatest periods of activity occurring in the 1920s and 1950s.

More recently, the Chiricahuas have fallen into use by people smugglers and drug cartels, who position lookouts on their peaks to warn of Border Patrol activities.

Geology overview

The Chiricahua Mountains are an uplifted structural  block of the Basin and Range. The mountains contain Precambrian basement rocks, Paleozoic and Cretaceous sedimentary rocks around a caldera complex formed by volcanic eruptions and intrusions 35–25 million years ago. The last major eruption, 27 million years ago, created the Turkey Creek Caldera and laid down  of volcanic ash which fused into welded rhyolite tuff.  Subsequent erosion has created mountain ridges covered in stone spires and stone columns, hoodoos, that rise up out of the forest. These natural features, preserved in the Chiricahua National Monument, are composed of Rhyolite Canyon Tuff.

A one to two mile wide band of sedimentary rock running southeast to northwest from south of Portal through Paradise and up to the Dos Cabezas Mountains is the source of mineralized deposits.
The largest of the mines developed in the California district of the Chiricahua Mountains was the Hilltop mine which consisted of 3 interconnected levels totaling .

Flora and fauna

The Chiricahua Mountains are a bio-diverse area which is composed of numerous sky islands.  Five of the 9 life zones are found in the Chiricahua Mountains.  Three hundred and seventy-five avian species have been recorded from the Chiricahua Mountains; some are largely Mexican species for which southern Arizona is the northern limits of their ranges. Other animals of note include ocelots, jaguars, mountain lions, black bears, and white-tailed deer. Of note is that perhaps the last remaining jaguar in the United States is found here, a male named Sombra by wildlife officials.

Grasslands and desert cover the base of the range, with ponderosa pine and Douglas fir at the highest elevations. Cave Creek Canyon on the east side is home to the American Museum of Natural History Southwest Research Station and the small towns of Portal and Paradise.

Species associated with the range

 Arizona sycamore
 Catocala violenta (=Catocala chiricahua)
 Charadra tapa
 Chiricahua leopard frog
 Eared quetzal
 Elegant trogon
 Nine-banded armadillo

 Hypotrix lunata
 Johann's pinyon
 Lilium parryi
 Lithophane leeae
 Madrean pine-oak woodlands
 Rocky Mountain Douglas-fir
 Tricholita ferrisi– ((?) found only at Onion Saddle)

Gallery

See also
 Chiricahua National Monument
 Dos Cabezas Mountains
 Shootout at Wilson Ranch
 Gleeson Gunfight

References

External links

 The Nature Explorers Chiricahua Expedition A 2-hour 49 minute ecosystem video.
 
 
 Chiricahua Peak Summit, trails, mountainzone.com, (coord)
 Chiricahua Mountains Study Area
 Map of Chiricahua and Dos Cabezas Mountains
 Chiricahua – Peloncillo Historical Society
 

 
Mountain ranges of Cochise County, Arizona
Madrean Sky Islands mountain ranges
Coronado National Forest
Mountain ranges of Arizona